Külaoru is a village in Võru Parish, Võru County in southeastern Estonia.

Gallery

References

Villages in Võru County